Kothangudi is a village in the Kumbakonam taluk of Thanjavur district, Tamil Nadu, India.

Demographics 

As per the 2001 census, Kothangudi had a total population of 1959 with 990 males and 969 females. The sex ratio was 979. The literacy rate was 65.59

References 

 

Villages in Thanjavur district